This is a list of the members of the Riigikogu, following the 1992 election.

Election results
Results:

Members
Members were:
 Juhan Aare
 Jüri Adams
 Priit Aimla
 Sulev Alajõe
 Toomas Alatalu
 Olav Anton
 Tiit Arge
 Rein Arjukese
 Lembit Arro
 Tiina Benno
 Jaanus Betlem
 Endel Eero
 Lauri Einer
 Peeter Ello
 Ants Erm
 Ignar Fjuk
 Epp Haabsaar
 Illar Hallaste
 Vootele Hansen
 Arvo Haug
 Rein Hanson
 Andres Heinapuu
 Rein Helme
 Jaak Herodes
 Mati Hint
 Liia Hänni
 Karin Jaani
 Toivo Jullinen
 Arvo Junti
 Tõnu Juul
 Rein Järlik
 Kalle Jürgenson
 Toivo Jürgenson
 Vambo Kaal
 Aivar Kala
 Kaido Kama
 Indrek Kannik
 Jaan Kaplinski
 Tunne Kelam
 Avo Kiir
 Valve Kirsipuu
 Rein Kikerpill
 Krista Kilvet
 Heiki Kranich
 Jaan Kross
 Kalev Kukk
 Tõnu-Reid Kukk
 Kalle Kulbok
 Mihkel Kraav
 Merle Krigul
 Tõnu Kõrda
 Tiit Käbin
 Ants Käärma
 Lembit Küüts
 Ülo Laanoja
 Mart Laar
 Marju Lauristin
 Jaan Leetsaar
 Daimar Liiv
 Katrin Linde
 Peeter Lorents
 Jüri Luik
 Ants-Enno Lõhmus
 Tiit Made
 Uno Mereste
 Paul-Olev Mõtsküla
 Ilmar Mändmets
 Aap Neljas
 Eiki Nestor
 Viktor Niitsoo
 Mart-Olav Niklus
 Ülo Nugis
 Mart Nutt
 Ardo Ojasalu
 Kristiina Ojuland
 Siiri Oviir
 Ralf R. Parve
 Vambola Põder
 Georg Erich Põld
 Kalju Põldvere
 Eve Pärnaste
 Mihkel Pärnoja
 Ilmar Pärtelpoeg
 Matti Päts
 Kalev Raave
 Jaanus Raidal
 Ivar Raig
 Kuno Raude
 Heiki Raudla
 Jaak Roosaare
 Vardo Rumessen
 Paul-Eerik Rummo
 Jüri Rätsep
 Vello Saatpalu
 Edgar Savisaar
 Tiit Sinissaar
 Riivo Sinijärv
 Arvo Sirendi
 Edgar Spriit
 Aime Sügis
 Aldo Tamm
 Eino Tamm
 Sergei Zonov
 Andres Tarand
 Enn Tarto
 Kirill Teiter
 Tõnu Tepandi
 Jüri Toomepuu
 Olli Toomik
 Liina Tõnisson
 Toivo Uustalo
 Lauri Vahtre
 Arvo Vallikivi
 Andra Veidemann
 Rein Veidemann
 Trivimi Velliste
 Andrus Villem
 Heido Vitsur
 Ülo Vooglaid
 Raoul Üksvärav

References

7th